Wuhuan Boulevard Station, is a station of Line 1 of Wuhan Metro. It entered revenue service on July 29, 2010. It is located in Dongxihu District.

Station layout

Transfers
Bus transfers to Route 218, 222, 560, 736, 528, H83 inner line and HM2 are available at Wuhuan Avenue Station.

References

Wuhan Metro stations
Line 1, Wuhan Metro
Railway stations in China opened in 2010